Crassispira appressa is a species of sea snail, a marine gastropod mollusk in the family Pseudomelatomidae.

Description
The length of the shell varies between 7.5 mm and 12 mm.

Distribution
This marine species occurs off Cabo San Lucas, Baja California, Mexico

References

 Carpenter. Ann. Mag. N. H., 1864, xiv, p. 46
 Carpenter P. (1872) The Mollusks of Western North America, Smithsonian Institution, Washington

External links
 
 

appressa
Gastropods described in 1864
Taxa named by Philip Pearsall Carpenter